Gonçalo Mendes de Sousa The Good (1120–1190) was a Portuguese nobleman, who participated in the Battle of Ourique.

Biography 

Gonçalo was the son of Mem Viegas de Sousa and Teresa Fernandes de Marnel. His wife was Urraca Sanches de Celanova, daughter of Sancho Nunes de Barbosa and Sancha Henriques (daughter of Henry, Count of Portugal  and Theresa, Countess of Portugal).
 
Gonçalo Mendes de Sousa was the grandson of Egas Gomes de Sousa and Gontinha Gonçalves da Maia, granddaughter of Trastamiro Aboazar.

References 

1120 births
1190 deaths
12th-century Portuguese people
Medieval Portuguese nobility
Portuguese Roman Catholics